Anne Mary Brooksbank (born 1943) is an Australian writer. She has written a number of novels as well as scripts for film and TV.

She teaches screenwriting at The Australian Film Television and Radio School.

Personal life
She was born in Melbourne and studied English literature and history at Melbourne University and painting at the National Gallery School before becoming a professional writer.

She was married to Bob Ellis, with whom she occasionally collaborated.

Novels
Mad Dog Morgan (1976)
Archer (1985)
On Loan (1990)
All My Love (1991)
Marriage Acts (2000)
Mother's Day (2005)
Sir Katherine
Big Thursday
Father's Day

Select film and TV credits
Avengers of the Reef (1973)
Case for the Defence (1978)
Maybe This Time (1980)
The Winds of Jarrah (1983)
Land of Hope (1986)
All My Love (2015), a play about Henry Lawson and Mary Gilmore's relationship.
Don't Tell (2017)

References

External links

1943 births
Living people
Australian women novelists
20th-century Australian novelists
21st-century Australian novelists
Australian women screenwriters
Australian television writers
Australian women television writers
20th-century Australian women writers
21st-century Australian women writers
Screenwriting instructors